Snapshots is the 12th studio album and the first covers album by British singer Kim Wilde. It was released in Germany on 26 August 2011 by Columbia SevenOne. The album features versions of songs hand-picked by Wilde from the last five decades. It was later released in other European countries, including the United Kingdom, on 28 November 2011.

Background
The album was preceded by its lead single, which is a double release of "It's Alright" and "Sleeping Satellite", originally recorded by East 17 and Tasmin Archer respectively. They were released on 19 August 2011 and both songs have an accompanying music video. Also on the album is a duet with her husband Hal Fowler on the final track "Kooks", originally by David Bowie. The digital download version of the album available on the iTunes Store includes the bonus track "I'll Stand by You", originally by the Pretenders, as well as the music videos for "It's Alright" and "Sleeping Satellite". A track-by-track interview was also available as an extra bonus for those who pre-ordered the album on iTunes. Another bonus track has been made available on an exclusive edition of the album only sold at Saturn stores. The song included is "Forever Young", originally recorded by Alphaville and first covered by Laura Branigan.

"To France", originally by Mike Oldfield featuring Maggie Reilly, was released digitally on 2 December 2011 as the second single from the album. It includes a brand new Christmas remix of the song as well as a remix of "It's Alright". The third single "Ever Fallen in Love (With Someone You Shouldn't've)", originally by the Buzzcocks, was released on 24 February 2012, under the shortened title of "Ever Fallen in Love", to promote Wilde's European tour. It was again only released digitally and includes a previously unreleased cover of "Spirit in the Sky", originally by Norman Greenbaum.

Track listing

Charts

Release history

References

2011 albums
Kim Wilde albums
Sony Music Germany albums
Covers albums